Oystermouth Cemetery (Welsh: Mynwentydd Ystumllwynarth) is a municipal cemetery in the village of Oystermouth, Swansea, South Wales. It was opened in 1883 and remains in use today, run by the Cemeteries and Crematorium Division of the City and County of Swansea. It has 14,162 grave spaces.

The cemetery contains the Commonwealth war graves of 83 service personnel, 28 from World War I and 55 from World War II.

The cemetery offers "woodland burial ground" as an alternative to traditional burial or cremation, the first of its kind in south-west Wales.

Notable interments

 Trevor Ford, Welsh international footballer
 William Charles Fuller, World War I Victoria Cross recipient
 Morfydd Llwyn Owen, musician, composer.
 Harry Parr-Davies, composer
 Rush Rhees, philosopher and lecturer at Swansea University

References

External links
 
 Oystermouth Cemetery at A History of Mumbles
 

1883 establishments in Wales
Buildings and structures in Swansea
Cemeteries in Wales
Commonwealth War Graves Commission cemeteries in Wales